Cynodonteae is a large tribe of grasses in the subfamily Chloridoideae, with over 800 species.

Like most of the subfamily, species in the tribe are adapted to warm, arid climates and use the C4 photosynthetic pathway, with the exception of Eleusine indica. Some species, such as Bermuda grass (Cynodon dactylon) or goosegrass (Eleusine indica), are widespread weeds, introduced in many countries.

Most of the 94 genera are classified in one of 21 subtribes, but some are still unplaced (incertae sedis) within the tribe.

References

Chloridoideae
Poaceae tribes